D1 or Belorussko-Savyolovsky Diameter is the first of the Moscow Central Diameters, a suburban network in Moscow which uses the existing infrastructure of Moscow Railway and provides a regular connection between Moscow and surrounding cities. MCD-1 runs from Lobnya via Dolgoprudny and Moscow to Odintsovo.

The line was opened on 21 November 2019, at the same day as D2. It uses the tracks and the stations of the Savyolovsky and the Belorussky suburban railway lines. These suburban directions have been connected earlier, and through suburban trains were running between them, therefore the initial investment to open the line was minimum.

Modified Ivolga trains have been serving the line since its opening with EP2D (  trains.

Stations

The stations between Mark and Setun are in Moscow, others are in Moscow Oblast.

References

 
Moscow Railway
Railway lines in Russia
Railway lines opened in 2019
2019 establishments in Russia